The Budapest Castle Hill Funicular or Budavári Sikló is a funicular railway in the city of Budapest, in Hungary. It links the Adam Clark Square and the Széchenyi Chain Bridge at river level to Buda Castle above.

The line was opened on March 2, 1870, and has been in municipal ownership since 1920. It was destroyed in the Second World War and reopened on June 4, 1986. A feature of the line are the two pedestrian foot bridges which cross above it. These were present when the line opened, were removed in 1900 when the castle's garden was extended, and rebuilt to the original design in 1983.

History

The building of the line started in July 1868, the first test run was on 23 October 1869. The Sikló has operated for the public since 2 March 1870. This funicular rail was the second in Europe, only Lyon had a similar transportation system at that time.

During the Second World War the cars and the terminals were destroyed by bombs.

The remnants of the funicular were then dismantled. Replacement with escalators was considered later. Reconstruction of the funicular was decided in 1965, and several plans were made, but the construction works were delayed. A midibus service between the two termini (line "V") was launched in 1975. This was in operation until the line was finally reopened in 1986.

Technical parameters

The line has the following technical parameters:
Length: 
Height: 
gradient: 31.75° (62%)
Cars: 2
Capacity: 24 passengers per car
Configuration: Double track
Maximum speed: 
Track gauge:  
Traction: Electricity
Trip time: 1 minute 30 seconds

Operation 
The line is operated by the BKV (Mass Transport Company of Budapest), and operates from 07.30 to 22.00 each day.
It is subject to special fare.

Gallery

See also 
List of funicular railways

References

Further reading

Zoltán Fónagy: Furnicular of Buda in the online database The Castle of Buda
Castle Hill

Funicular railways in Hungary
Transport in Budapest
Industrial archaeological sites in Hungary
Buda Castle